Charsada (Chahar Sada) District is a District of Ghor province, Afghanistan. It was created from the northwestern part of Chaghcharan District in 2005.  The district center is Qale-Zobayd.  The population is 26,600.

See also 
 Chaghcharan District
 Ghor Province
 Qale-Zobayd

References

Districts of Ghor Province